Albert Estopinal (January 30, 1845 – April 28, 1919) was an American Civil War veteran who served seven terms as a U.S. Representative from Louisiana from 1908 to 1919.

Biography 
Albert Estopinal was born in St. Bernard Parish, Louisiana, on January 30, 1845. He attended both public and private schools before leaving school in January 1862 to enlist in the Confederate Army.

Civil War
During the Civil War, Estopinal served in Company G, Twenty-eighth Regiment of the Louisiana Infantry. He eventually rose to the rank of sergeant of Company G, Twenty-second Louisiana Heavy Artillery. There, he served throughout the Civil War.

Political career 
After the war, he engaged in the commission business at New Orleans for several years, although most of his life was spent at his home, "Kenilworth Plantation," near New Orleans.

He served as sheriff of St. Bernard Parish from 1872 to 1876, and was a member of the Louisiana House of Representatives from 1876 to 1880. He was member of the state constitutional conventions in both 1879 and 1898. He then served in the Louisiana State Senate from 1880 to 1900, then was elected Lieutenant Governor, serving from 1900 to 1904.

He was chairman of the Democratic State central committee in 1908, before being elected as a Democrat to the Sixtieth Congress to fill the vacancy caused by the death of Adolph Meyer. He was subsequently reelected to the Sixty-first and to the five succeeding Congresses, serving from November 3, 1908, until his death.

Death 
Estopinal died in New Orleans on April 28, 1919. His interment was in St. Louis Cemetery No. 3, in New Orleans.

See also 
 List of minority governors and lieutenant governors in the United States

References

Democratic Party members of the United States House of Representatives from Louisiana
American people of Spanish descent
Hispanic and Latino American members of the United States Congress
Democratic Party members of the Louisiana House of Representatives
Democratic Party Louisiana state senators
1919 deaths
1845 births